Murat Ünalmış (born 23 April 1981) is a Turkish actor.

Life and career 
Ünalmış spent his childhood in Kayseri before moving to Istanbul to attend secondary school. During his high school years, he played for the basketball team of Fenerbahçe S.K. After graduating from Marmara University with a degree in communication studies, Ünalmış studied acting at Academy Istanbul. 

Shortly after finishing his studies, he appeared in a number of TV series, including Hayat Bağları, Sınırlı Aşk, and Kurşun Yarası as well as movies such as Üç Kadın, Deli Duran, and Sen Ne Dilersen. Her breakthrough came with a role in Mahsun Kırmızıgül's Güneşi Gördüm. He later appeared in another film directed by Kırmızıgül, titled New York'ta Beş Minare. 

Ünalmış also had a leading role in the series Yer Gök Aşk. He was then cast in TRT 1's Sevda Kuşun Kanadında. With Uğur Güneş, İbrahim Çelikkol, he played in mini historical series "Seddülbahir 32 Saat".In 2018, he got the leading role in the period drama series Bir Zamanlar Çukurova.

Filmography

Film 
 New York'ta Beş Minare - 2010
 Güneşi Gördüm - 2009 (Mamo)
 Gecenin Kanatları - 2009 (Yusuf)
 Celal Oğlan

Television 
 Bir Zamanlar Çukurova - 2018–2021 (Demir Yaman)
 Deli Gönül - 2017 (Mehmet Kadir Ölçek)
 Sevda Kuşun Kanadında - 2016 (Arif Ünlü)
 Seddülbahir 32 Saat - 2016 (Mahmut Sabri)
 İnadına Yaşamak - 2013 (Ali)
 Babalar ve Evlatları - 2012
 Yer Gök Aşk - 2010 (Yusuf Hancıoğlu)
 Kasaba
 Rüzgâr
 Sır Gibi
 Şöhret
 Üç Kadın
 Deli Duran
 Sınırlı Aşk
 Kurşun Yarası - 2003

References

External links 
 
 

Turkish male film actors
Turkish male television actors
1981 births
Living people
People from Kayseri
Marmara University alumni